Defunctland is an ongoing YouTube web series that documents the history of discontinued amusement parks and amusement park attractions, created and hosted by Kevin Perjurer. The show presents the history and downfall of theme parks and attractions from around the world, most notably those of Disney, Universal, and Six Flags. The show premiered on February 15, 2017, and has been praised for its extensive research and television-quality production values.  

The channel has amassed over 1.4 million subscribers . The success of Defunctland led to two spin-offs: Debunkedland and DefunctTV, both of which premiered in 2018.

VR Park
Initially, the Defunctland YouTube series was meant to be a showcase for attractions that would be a part of a virtual theme park of the same name. Soon after starting the channel in 2017, Perjurer uploaded a video called "Defunctland VR: The Sorcerer's Hat" to show off the initial prototype of the park. While volunteers with knowledge of virtual reality environments did sign up, progress has been considered relatively slow. 

About a year later, Perjurer made a post on his website about the VR Park to explain that it was still happening, as well as show off some of the progress up to that point. A video was uploaded in January 2021, showing a virtual reality version of 20,000 Leagues Under the Sea: Submarine Voyage, as well as other parts of the park.

Episodes

Series overview

Season 1 (2017) 
The first season of Defunctland, created by Kevin Perjurer, premiered on the YouTube channel of the same name on February 15, 2017, and lasted for 22 episodes. Initially, each episode ended with Perjurer polling the viewers on where the attraction should go in the VR Park, however, this was phased out by the end of the season. Perjurer originally pitched his voice lower during his narrations, which was also dropped before the end of the season. The season finale premiered on December 11, 2017.

Season 2 (2018–19)
The second season of Defunctland premiered on February 5, 2018. A common theme throughout the season was the rise and fall of Michael Eisner and his effects on the Disney Parks and The Walt Disney Company as a whole. This season ended on March 22, 2019. The 11th and 12th production blocks were used to produce a double-length episode on the failure of Disney's America, while an additional 23rd production block was used to remake the Season 1 episode on Disney California Adventure's Superstar Limo. 

The production value of each episode increased dramatically in the second season, with episodes extending in length and utilizing custom graphics fit to the theme of the episode. Some episodes even include customized theme songs or music. Perjurer stated that the cost of each episode averages around $1,000, with some being as expensive as $2,000.

Season 3 (2019–present) 
The third season of Defunctland premiered on October 5, 2019. It will last for 22 episodes, of which 12 have been released so far. It will have an overarching theme of revisionism and futurism, as well as hinting at the future influence that Walt Disney would receive when he eventually decided to build Disneyland. An additional 23rd production block was used to remake the Season 1 episode on Disneyland's Videopolis.

Minisodes (2017–present) 
Between the release of main Defunctland episodes, Perjurer will occasionally release smaller Defunctland "minisodes". These episodes can relate to topics outside of theme parks.

Debunkedland 
The first Defunctland spin-off, Debunkedland, was created by Kevin Perjurer and Noah Randall. Hosted by Randall, the series focused on debunking various rumors and myths about theme parks and theme park attractions. The initial run of the series, hosted by Randall on the Defunctland YouTube channel, lasted for only two episodes in April 2018. The series was rebooted with a third episode on the Themed Alternative YouTube channel, hosted by the mysterious "K", voiced by Bleaker, written by Corvyn Hartwick and edited by Heath Jinkins. This new incarnation of the series premiered on October 24, 2019.

Season 1 (Hosted by Noah Randall)

Season 2 (Hosted by "K")

DefunctTV 
The second Defunctland spin-off, DefunctTV, premiered on June 12, 2018. It was co-created by Kevin Perjurer and Heath Jinkins, and hosted by Perjurer. The show takes a look at the history of defunct television shows, their inception, and what eventually led to their downfall.

Season 1 (2018–present)

DefunctTV: Jim Henson (2019) 
A six-episode DefunctTV miniseries on the life and work of Jim Henson premiered on April 16, 2019, and ended on July 14, 2019.

Feature-length documentaries
On August 20, 2020, Defunctland released Live from the Space Stage: A Halyx Story, a feature-length documentary about Halyx, a space-themed band that performed at Disneyland's Tomorrowland Space Stage in 1981, including interviews with Gary Krisel, Mike Post, Jymn Magon, and members of Halyx. A second feature-length documentary, Disney's FastPass: A Complicated History, was released on November 21, 2021. A third feature-length documentary, Disney Channel's Theme: A History Mystery, was released on November 20, 2022.

References

External links
 
 
 

American non-fiction web series
Documentary web series
2010s YouTube series
2017 web series debuts
2020s YouTube series
Historical television series
Documentary television series about art